14th SDFCS Awards
December 15, 2009

Best Film: 
Inglourious Basterds

Best Director: 
Quentin Tarantino
Inglourious Basterds

The 14th San Diego Film Critics Society Awards were announced on December 15, 2009.

Winners and nominees

Best Actor
Colin Firth — A Single Man
George Clooney — Up in the Air
Matt Damon — The Informant!
Ben Foster — The Messenger
Christian McKay — Me and Orson Welles
Viggo Mortensen — The Road
Jeremy Renner — The Hurt Locker

Best Actress
Michelle Monaghan — Trucker
Sandra Bullock — The Blind Side
Abbie Cornish — Bright Star
Carey Mulligan — An Education
Meryl Streep — Julie & Julia

Best Animated Film
Up
9
Coraline
Fantastic Mr. Fox
Monsters vs. Aliens

Best Cinematography
The Road — Javier Aguirresarobe
Harry Potter and the Half-Blood Prince — Bruno Delbonnel
The Hurt Locker — Barry Ackroyd
Inglourious Basterds — Robert Richardson
A Single Man — Eduard Grau
The Young Victoria — Hagen Bogdanski

Best Director
Quentin Tarantino — Inglourious Basterds
Kathryn Bigelow — The Hurt Locker
James Cameron — Avatar
Joel Coen and Ethan Coen — A Serious Man
Tom Ford — A Single Man
Jason Reitman — Up in the Air

Best Documentary
The Cove
Anvil! The Story of Anvil
Capitalism: A Love Story
Food, Inc.
Valentino: The Last Emperor

Best Editing
(500) Days of Summer — Alan Edward Bell
District 9 — Julian Clarke
Inglourious Basterds — Sally Menke
The Hurt Locker — Bob Murawski
Zombieland — Peter Amundson and Alan Baumgarten

Best Ensemble Performance
Inglourious BasterdsHarry Potter and the Half-Blood PrinceIn the LoopThe MessengerA Serious ManUp in the AirZombielandBest FilmInglourious Basterds
(500) Days of Summer
The Hurt Locker
A Single Man
Up in the Air

Best Foreign Language Film
Il Divo • Italy
Amreeka • USA/Canada
Captain Abu Raed • Jordan
Lemon Tree (Etz Limon) • Israel/Germany/France
Red Cliff (Chi bi) • China
Sin Nombre • Spain
The Stoning of Soraya M. • USA
Thirst (Bakjwi) • South Korea
Treeless Mountain • South Korea

Best Production Design
Inglourious Basterds — David Wasco
Avatar — Rick Carter and Robert Stromberg
Harry Potter and the Half-Blood Prince — Stuart Craig
The Imaginarium of Doctor Parnassus — Anastasia Masaro
Me and Orson Welles — Laurence Dorman
A Single Man — Dan Bishop
Where the Wild Things Are — K. K. Barrett

Best Score
A Single Man — Abel Korzeniowski
(500) Days of Summer — Mychael Danna and Rob Simonsen
Fantastic Mr. Fox — Alexandre Desplat
Up — Michael Giacchino
Where the Wild Things Are — Carter Burwell and Karen O
The Young Victoria — Ilan Eshkeri

Best Original Screenplay
Inglourious Basterds — Quentin Tarantino
(500) Days of Summer — Scott Neustadter and Michael H. Weber
The Messenger — Alessandro Camon and Oren Moverman
A Serious Man — Joel Coen and Ethan Coen
Up — Bob Peterson and Pete Docter

Best Adapted Screenplay
Fantastic Mr. Fox — Wes Anderson and Noah Baumbach
The Informant! — Scott Z. Burns
Julie & Julia — Nora Ephron
A Single Man — Tom Ford and David Scearce
Up in the Air — Jason Reitman and Sheldon Turner

Best Supporting Actor
Christoph Waltz — Inglourious Basterds
Woody Harrelson — The Messenger
John Malkovich — The Great Buck Howard
Paul Schneider — Bright Star
Stanley Tucci — The Lovely Bones

Best Supporting Actress
Samantha Morton — The Messenger
Vera Farmiga — Up in the Air
Anna Kendrick — Up in the Air
Mélanie Laurent — Inglourious Basterds
Mo'Nique — Precious

Body of Work
Woody Harrelson — The Messenger, Zombieland and 2012

References

2
2009 film awards
2009 in American cinema